Geina integumentum is a species of moth in the genus Geina known from Puerto Rico and the Virgin Islands. Moths of this species take flight in July and August and have a wingspan of about 11-12 millimetres. The specific name "integumentum" refers to a "cover" over the ostium of the female.

References

Oxyptilini
Moths described in 2006
Taxa named by Cees Gielis